The 1991 SEC Men’s Basketball Tournament took place from March 7–10, 1991 at the Memorial Gymnasium on Vanderbilt University’s campus located in Nashville, Tennessee. The Alabama Crimson Tide won the tournament and received the SEC’s automatic bid to the 1991 NCAA Men’s Division I Basketball Tournament by defeating the Tennessee Volunteers by a score of 88–69.

Television coverage of the first round, the quarterfinals, and semifinals were regionally syndicated by Jefferson Pilot Sports, and the championship game was nationally televised on ABC. 
 
Note: The Kentucky Wildcats men's basketball team was not qualified to participate in either the SEC or NCAA tournaments of both 1990 and 1991 due to NCAA probation.

Bracket

References

SEC men's basketball tournament
1990–91 Southeastern Conference men's basketball season
SEC men's b
Basketball competitions in Nashville, Tennessee
College sports tournaments in Tennessee
20th century in Nashville, Tennessee